"Lover Come Back to Me" is a 1985 single by English pop band Dead or Alive, produced by Stock Aitken Waterman. It was released as the second single from the band's second album, Youthquake, and the single mix features slightly different instrumentation to the album version but is generally the same. The single peaked at No. 11 in the UK, No. 3 in South Africa, No. 5 in Switzerland, No. 21 in Germany, No. 13 in Australia and No. 75 on the US Billboard Hot 100.

In addition to the standard 7" and 12" formats (the latter of which included a sleeve which could be opened up in to a poster), a fan-shaped picture disc was also released in the UK. The B-side to the single was "Far Too Hard", a song from the band's first album.

Like "You Spin Me Round (Like a Record)", the song was re-recorded in 2003 for the band's retrospective compilation Evolution: The Hits.

Critical reception
The single generally received positive reviews, being described as "appealing" by Ira Robbins while Ned Raggett of AllMusic said, "When Burns commands at the end of the chorus, 'Kick it right down, right down!' it's as memorable as mass media pop of any stripe ever gets."

Track listing

Chart performance

References

External links

1985 singles
1985 songs
Dead or Alive (band) songs
Epic Records singles
Songs written by Pete Burns
Song recordings produced by Stock Aitken Waterman
Songs written by Tim Lever
Songs written by Mike Percy (musician)